St George's Church, Venice is an Anglican parish church in Venice, Italy in the Diocese in Europe.

History

The church was established by the Revd. John Davies Mereweather, Cavaliere della Corona d'Italia, who had settled in Venice. He held services in his flat in the Palazzo Contarini-Corfu until 1887.

The current church building in the Campo San Vio was formerly the warehouse for the Venezia-Murano Glass and Mosaic Company. It was built to a design by engineer Luigi Marangoni, with sculptures by Napoleone Martinuzzi and dedicated in 1892.

References

External links
 
 

Venice
Churches in Venice
Venice, George
Venice, George
Diocese in Europe
19th-century churches in Italy